Crawford's Experiment Farm, in Williston, Tennessee, was listed on the National Register of Historic Places in 1991.  The listing included three contributing buildings and a contributing structure.

The residence on the property has evolved from an original c.1850 three-bay frame house, with elements of Greek Revival style.  An 1867 modification added two bedrooms and an east gallery to the main house.  Others are:
Kitchen (c. 1850)
Doctor's Office (1867), built by William Harrison Crawford
Crib (c. 1850), board and batten on brick piers
Barn (1940), a large, tin, hay barn later converted into a horse barn.

It has also been known as Pleasant Retreat, as Walker Farm, and as Crawford Farm, and is located at the junction of Hotel St. and Old Somerville-Williston Rd.

It is included in the Williston Historic District, also listed on the National Register.

References

National Register of Historic Places in Tennessee
Greek Revival architecture in Tennessee
Buildings and structures completed in 1850
Fayette County, Tennessee
1850 establishments in Tennessee